Propiolic acid is the organic compound with the formula HC2CO2H.  It is the simplest acetylenic carboxylic acid.  It is a colourless liquid that crystallises to give silky crystals.  Near its boiling point, it decomposes.

It is soluble in water and possesses an odor like that of acetic acid.

Preparation
It is prepared commercially by oxidizing propargyl alcohol at a lead electrode. It can also be prepared by decarboxylation of acetylenedicarboxylic acid.

Reactions and applications
Exposure to sunlight converts it into trimesic acid (benzene-1,3,5-tricarboxylic acid). It undergoes bromination to give dibromoacrylic acid.  With hydrogen chloride it forms chloroacrylic acid. Its ethyl ester condenses with hydrazine to form pyrazolone.

It forms a characteristic explosive solid upon treatment to its aqueous solution with ammoniacal silver nitrate.  An amorphous explosive precipitate forms with ammoniacal cuprous chloride.

Propiolates
Propiolates are esters or salts of propiolic acid.  Common examples include methyl propiolate and ethyl propiolate.

See also
 Propargyl
 Propargyl alcohol

References

Carboxylic acids
Alkyne derivatives